Cyperus macropachycephalus is a species of sedge that is native to parts of Papua New Guinea.

See also 
 List of Cyperus species

References 

macropachycephalus
Plants described in 1989
Flora of New Guinea